Capuchin Swing is an album by American saxophonist Jackie McLean recorded in 1960 and released on the Blue Note label. It features McLean in a quintet featuring trumpeter Blue Mitchell, pianist Walter Bishop Jr., bassist Paul Chambers and drummer Art Taylor. McLean and Mitchell do not play on “Don’t Blame Me”.

Reception

The Allmusic review by Stephen Cook stated: "One of McLean's more underrated albums from a plethora of Blue Note releases, 1960's Capuchin Swing finds the bebop alto saxophonist in fine form on a mix of covers and originals... Capuchin Swing makes for a great introduction to McLean's extensive catalog".

Track listing
All compositions by Jackie McLean except as indicated.
 "Francisco" - 9:33
 "Just for Now" (Walter Bishop, Jr.) - 7:33
 "Don't Blame Me" (Dorothy Fields, Jimmy McHugh) - 4:24
 "Condition Blue" - 8:13
 "Capuchin Swing" - 6:10
 "On the Lion" (Bishop) - 4:44

Personnel
Jackie McLean - alto saxophone
Blue Mitchell - trumpet
Walter Bishop, Jr. - piano
Paul Chambers - bass
Art Taylor - drums

References

Blue Note Records albums
Jackie McLean albums
1960 albums
Albums produced by Alfred Lion
Albums recorded at Van Gelder Studio